Volog is a small settlement west of Šmartno ob Dreti in the Municipality of Nazarje in Slovenia. The area belongs to the traditional region of Styria and is now included in the Savinja Statistical Region.

References

External links
Volog on Geopedia

Populated places in the Municipality of Nazarje